Gone Too Far! is a play written by Bola Agbaje. 
It was produced at the Royal Court Theatre in February 2007, and won the Olivier Award for Outstanding Achievement in an Affiliate Theatre in 2008.

Further reading

References

External links
 https://whatson.bfi.org.uk/lff/Online/default.asp?BOparam::WScontent::loadArticle::permalink=gone-too-far  Information about film at the London Film Festival
 http://www.timeout.com/london/film/gone-too-far  Time Out Film Review

Laurence Olivier Award-winning plays